The Belgian Bowl VIII was played in 1995 and was won by the Tournai Cardinals. Although it was the first Belgian Bowl, it was numbered 8 because it was the 8th official BFL Season.

References

External links
Official Belgian Bowl website

American football in Belgium
Belgian Bowl
Belgian Bowl